The 1976–77 Football League season was Birmingham City Football Club's 74th in the Football League and their 43rd in the First Division. They finished in 13th position in the 22-team division. They entered the 1976–77 FA Cup at the third round proper and lost in the fourth to Leeds United, and lost to Blackpool in their opening second-round match in the League Cup.

Twenty-one players made at least one appearance in nationally organised first-team competition, and there were thirteen different goalscorers. Midfielder Terry Hibbitt and forward Trevor Francis played in all 45 first-team matches over the season, and the leading goalscorer was Francis with 21 goals, all scored in the league. Kenny Burns scored 20, of which 19 came in league competition.

Football League First Division

League table (part)

FA Cup

League Cup

Appearances and goals

Numbers in parentheses denote appearances as substitute.
Players with name struck through and marked  left the club during the playing season.
Players with names in italics and marked * were on loan from another club for the whole of their season with Birmingham.

See also
Birmingham City F.C. seasons

References
General
 
 
 Source for match dates and results: 
 Source for lineups, appearances, goalscorers and attendances: Matthews (2010), Complete Record, pp. 388–89.

Specific

Birmingham City F.C. seasons
Birmingham City